Leo Ku is a cantopop singer in Hong Kong.  Since his debut in 1994, he has released twenty studio albums and six compilation albums.

His most successful songs to date are "Love and Honesty" (Nobita),  "Never Too Late" (Human) and "The Genius and the Idiot".  "Never Too Late" has received a lot of praise because its lyrics that reflects on how people in Hong Kong often neglect their family and friends due to their busy schedule.  The song alone won more than eighteen awards between 2004 and 2005 including RTHK Golden Song of the Year and Hit Song of the Year from Metro Showbiz Hit Awards.  Because of the popularity of the song, Leo had won the Gold Award of Best Male Artist in Ultimate Song Chart Award in 2004, in which Eason Chan, his competitor, failed to get any award that year.

Commercial Radio Hong Kong Ultimate Song Chart Awards
The Ultimate Song Chart Awards Presentation (叱咤樂壇流行榜頒獎典禮) is a cantopop award ceremony from one of the famous channel in Commercial Radio Hong Kong known as Ultimate 903 (FM 90.3).  Unlike other cantopop award ceremonies, this one is judged based on the popularity of the song/artist on the actual radio show.  Leo has won twenty-two of these awards since 1995 including a gold for Ultimate Male Artist in 2004.

IFPI Hong Kong Sales Awards
IFPI Awards is given to artists base on the sales in Hong Kong at the end of the year.

Jade Solid Gold Top 10 Awards
The Jade Solid Gold Songs Awards Ceremony(十大勁歌金曲頒獎典禮) is held annually in Hong Kong since 1984.  The awards are based on Jade Solid Gold show on TVB.

Metro Radio Mandarin Music Awards

Metro Showbiz Hit Awards
The Metro Showbiz Hit Awards (新城勁爆頒獎禮) is held in Hong Kong annually by Metro Showbiz radio station.  It focus mostly in cantopop music.

MTV Asia Awards
The MTV Asia Awards is the Asian equivalent to the MTV Awards in United States.  Since its debut in 2002, the show gives recognition to the Asian artist as well as international icons for their achievement in fashion, film and music.  There was no award ceremony in 2007.  Leo Ku has won one award in the "Most Popular Hong Kong Artist" category in 2008.

RTHK Top 10 Gold Songs Awards
The RTHK Top 10 Gold Songs Awards Ceremony(十大中文金曲頒獎音樂會) is held annually in Hong Kong since 1978.  The awards are determined by Radio and Television Hong Kong based on the work of all Asian artists (mostly cantopop) for the previous year.  Leo has won twenty-one of these awards.

Sprite Music Awards

Hong Kong TVB8 Awards

References

Ku, Leo
Cantopop